The Rosh HaAyin North railway station is a suburban passenger railway station in Israel, operated by Israel Railways. It is situated in north Rosh HaAyin near the Kesem Interchange which is located at the intersection of Highway 5 and the Cross-Israel Highway.

The station has one side platform and one island platform serving a total of 3 tracks. As part of the Eastern Railway rebuilding project an additional side platform will be built at the station, allowing it to serve a total of four tracks.

Facilities at the station:
 Wheelchair Accessibility
 Ticket Machine
 Parking adjacent to the station
 Food and Drinks shop
 Bicycle parking
 Wi-Fi

Train service

Ridership

References

Railway stations in Central District (Israel)
Railway stations opened in 2003
2003 establishments in Israel